Ethmiopsis prosectrix is a moth in the family Gelechiidae. It was described by Edward Meyrick in 1935. It is found in China (Shanghai, Zhejiang).

References

Ethmiopsis
Moths described in 1935
Taxa named by Edward Meyrick